Passu Glacier is situated in the south side of Passu village. Passu Peak is situated in the back side of the glacier. This glacier is linked with Batura Glacier and many other glaciers in Batura Muztagh  mountain range.

See also
Passu Sar
List of glaciers
Batura Glacier
Passu Peak

Glaciers of Gilgit-Baltistan